Marla Tanishe Brumfield (born June 6, 1978) is a former professional basketball player who spent three seasons in the WNBA. She was the first women's basketball player from the Western Athletic Conference to be drafted by the WNBA.

Statistics

Source

WNBA career statistics

Regular season

|-
| align="left" | 2000
| align="left" | Minnesota
| 32 || 17 || 19.2 || .465 || .111 || .690 || 1.9 || 1.3 || 0.7 || 0.1 || 1.3 || 3.9
|-
| align="left" | 2001
| align="left" | Miami
| 27 || 0 || 9.1 || .283 || .333 || 1.000 || 0.9 || 1.2 || 0.7 || 0.0 || 0.9 || 1.6
|-
| align="left" | 2003
| align="left" | Charlotte
| 25 || 0 || 4.9 || .375 || .000 || 1.000 || 0.4 || 0.6 || 0.0 || 0.0 || 0.2 || 0.7
|-
| align="left" | Career
| align="left" | 3 years, 3 teams
| 84 || 17 || 11.7 || .395 || .000 || 1.000 || 0.4 || 0.6 || 0.0 || 0.0 || 0.2 || 0.7

Playoffs

|-
| align="left" | 2001
| align="left" | Miami
| 2 || 0 || 2.0 || .500 || .000 || .000 || 0.0 || 0.0 || 0.5 || 0.0 || 0.0 || 1.0
|-
| align="left" | 2003
| align="left" | Charlotte
| 2 || 0 || 3.5 || .500 || .000 || .500 || 0.0 || 0.5 || 0.0 || 0.0 || 0.5 || 1.5
|-
| align="left" | Career
| align="left" | 2 years, 2 teams
| 4 || 0 || 2.8 || .500 || .000 || .500 || 0.0 || 0.3 || 0.3 || 0.0 || 0.3 || 1.3

References

External links

1978 births
Living people
American women's basketball coaches
American women's basketball players
Basketball coaches from Texas
Basketball players from Houston
Charlotte Sting players
Clemson Tigers women's basketball coaches
Guards (basketball)
Miami Sol players
Minnesota Lynx draft picks
Minnesota Lynx players
Prairie View A&M University alumni
Rice Owls women's basketball coaches
Rice Owls women's basketball players
Sportspeople from Houston